The 2019 WDF World Cup will be the 19th edition of the WDF World Cup darts tournament, organised by the World Darts Federation. It will be held in Cluj-Napoca, Romania from October 8 to 12.

Entered teams

27 countries/associations entered a team in the event, which is eleven less than 2011. Not all teams took part in all events (for example, Switzerland did not participate in the youth events).

  Australia
  Austria
  Brazil
  Bulgaria
  Canada
  Catalonia
  Croatia
  Cyprus
  Czech Republic
  Denmark
  Egypt
  England
  Estonia
  Ethiopia

  Finland
  France
  Germany
  Gibraltar
  Greece
  Hong Kong
  Hungary
  Iceland
  India
  Iran
  Ireland
  Isle of Man
  Italy
  Japan

  Jersey
  Latvia
  Lithuania
  Luxembourg
  Mongolia
  Netherlands
  New Zealand
  Northern Ireland
  Norway
  Pakistan
  Romania
  Russia
  Scotland
  Serbia

  Slovakia
  Slovenia
  South Africa
  South Korea
  Spain
  Sweden
  Switzerland
  Trinidad and Tobago
  Turkey
 
  Ukraine
  United States
  Wales

 Guyana and  Uganda originally entered, but both pulled out due to visa issues

Men's singles
Darren Herewini from New Zealand became the 2019 WDF World Cup champion.

Machin also plays a strong tournament and beats Daniel Day, Johan Engström and Nick Kenny, among others. This year again many different nationalities among the last sixteen, including three Swedes. Peter Machin is the third Australian to reach the final of the men's WDF World Cup singles, but after Peter Hinkley in 1997 and Raymond Smith in 2017, he too must settle for silver.

Women's singles

Boys' Singles

Girls' Singles

References

External links
 WDF site for 2019 World Cup

WDF World Cup darts
WDF World Cup